The biogeography of gastropods is the study of the distribution of the biodiversity of gastropods over space and time.

Prehistoric 
The study of the biogeography of gastropods is within the scope of paleobiogeography.

Marine 
The world's highest biodiversity of Volutomitridae is in waters of New Caledonia.

Non-marine 
The biogeography of non-marine gastropods (freshwater snails, land snails and slugs) is often studied along with that of freshwater bivalves.

References

Further reading

Marine 
 García F. J. & Bertsch H. (2009) "Diversity and distribution of the Gastropoda Opisthobranchia from the Atlantic Ocean: A global biogeographic approach". Scientia Marina 73(1):  Supplement

External links 

Gastropods by location
Biogeography